Lionel Billas (3 February 1929 – 17 July 1995) was a French long-distance runner. He competed in the marathon at the 1952 Summer Olympics.

References

1929 births
1995 deaths
Athletes (track and field) at the 1952 Summer Olympics
French male long-distance runners
French male marathon runners
Olympic athletes of France
People from Commercy
Sportspeople from Meuse (department)
20th-century French people